Chickengrove Bottom is a 9.8 hectare biological Site of Special Scientific Interest to the south east of the village of Bowerchalke in Wiltshire, notified in 1975.

Sources

 Natural England citation sheet for the site (accessed 23 March 2022)

External links
 Natural England website (SSSI information)

Sites of Special Scientific Interest in Wiltshire
Sites of Special Scientific Interest notified in 1975